Diadegma brevipetiolatum is a wasp first described by Horstmann in 1969.
No subspecies are listed.

References

brevipetiolatum
Insects described in 1969